Timothy 'Tim' Bates is an Australian field hockey player.

Tim is from Queensland.

Field hockey
He plays for the Queensland Blades in the Australian Hockey League. He played for the team in the first found of the 2011 season.

National team
In July 2011, Bates was a member of the Kookaburras team at the INSEP Challenge in Paris.

In December 2011, he was named as one of fourteen players to be on the 2012 Summer Olympics Australian men's national Olympic development squad.  While this squad is not in the top twenty-eight and separate from the Olympic training coach, the Australian coach Ric Charlesworth did not rule out selecting from only the training squad, with players from the Olympic development having a chance at possibly being called up to represent Australia at the Olympics.  He trained with the team from 18 January to mid-March in Perth, Western Australia.

References

Australian male field hockey players
Field hockey people from Queensland
Living people
1988 births